Billboard Top Hits: 1985 is a compilation album released by Rhino Records in 1994, featuring ten hit recordings from 1985.

The track lineup includes eight songs that reached the top of the Billboard Hot 100 chart and two songs each reaching no. 2.

Track listing

Track information and credits were taken from the album's liner notes.

References

1994 compilation albums
Billboard Top Hits albums